Alfred Pickett (1871 – 19 March 1953) was an Australian cricketer. He played two first-class matches for Tasmania between 1899 and 1900.

See also
 List of Tasmanian representative cricketers

References

External links
 

1871 births
1953 deaths
Australian cricketers
Tasmania cricketers
Cricketers from Tasmania